Remigio may refer to:

Remigio (given name)
Remigio (surname)
Meanings of minor planet names: 58001–59000#672